Step Back in Time: The Definitive Collection is a 2019 greatest hits album by Australian singer Kylie Minogue, released on 28 June 2019 by BMG Rights Management. The compilation was made available in a variety of formats, including a two-disc edition, a picture disc vinyl and five limited edition cassette formats. The album includes "New York City", a previously unreleased song written during sessions for her fourteenth studio album, Golden (2018). The album debuted atop the charts in Australia and the United Kingdom.
An expanded version of the original album was released on 22 November 2019, including an extra disc with eight more singles from Minogue's career and a megamix produced by F9.

Background
Step Back in Time: The Definitive Collection is Minogue's fourth major greatest hits album, following the previous albums Greatest Hits (1992), Ultimate Kylie (2004) and The Best of Kylie Minogue (2012). The compilation takes its name from her 1990 single, "Step Back in Time", and is Minogue's first major greatest hits album under her contract with BMG. Step Back in Time: The Definitive Collection was released in various formats; a standard two-disc and deluxe book edition, a standard black vinyl and a mint-coloured and picture disc edition, and five limited-edition cassette formats.

Minogue began hinting at the compilation's release on 27 April, posting images on social media from the "Step Back in Time" music video, along with a countdown on her official website which was set to end on 3 May, but later moved forward to 2 May. Following this change, the countdown then displayed the album's slogan: "Pop Precision Since 1987". The release of the album and its single was then announced on 2 May, with pre-orders available that day.

The release was composed by two disc and saw singles included from various parts of her discography, however some singles were omitted from the release.
 
Some of the songs which were omitted from the first edition of the album were later added on the expanded version of the album.

The expanded edition also features a 18-song megamix produced by Freemasons, who were responsible for the single mix of "The One".

Promotion
In order to promote the compilation, Minogue appeared on both The Zoe Ball Breakfast Show on BBC Radio 2 and The Graham Norton Show on 3 May. On 3 June, she was interviewed on The One Show. On 22 November, she performed "Slow", mashed up with "Fashion" by David Bowie, on The Graham Norton Show.

Singles
"New York City" was released as a single from the compilation on 3 May 2019, premiering on BBC Radio 2 the same day. The song was originally a demo for Minogue's fourteenth studio album, Golden (2018). Due to demand and acclaim from fans and critics, the song was subsequently completed and released the following year.

Tour
Minogue embarked on her Summer 2019 tour to promote the album, consisting of 15 shows across Europe. The tour included her performance at the legend slot at the Glastonbury Festival 2019.

Commercial performance
Step Back in Time: The Definitive Collection debuted at number one in Australia on 6 July, becoming her sixth number one on the Australian Albums Chart. It also debuted at number one on the Australian Artist Albums and Vinyl Albums charts, making Minogue the first artist to top all three charts simultaneously.

On 5 July, the compilation debuted at number one in the United Kingdom, with 31,980 album-equivalent units as reported by Music Week. 25,992 of those units were taken from physical sales, including 5,682 vinyl copies. The album consequently remained in the top five for three consecutive weeks. Step Back in Time: The Definitive Collection became Minogue's seventh number one on the UK Albums Chart, making her the female artist with the second-most number ones on the chart. The album also debuted at number-one on the UK Vinyl Albums Chart, and was the biggest-selling cassette of the week.  In Ireland, it debuted at number four on the Irish Albums Chart, scoring the highest new entry of the week.

In Austria, Step Back in Time: The Definitive Collection debuted at number 21 on the Austrian Albums Chart. In Belgium, the album entered the Ultratop Wallonia region chart at number 25, and the Flanders region chart at number 9. In the Czech Republic, it debuted at number 45 on the Czech Albums Chart, and peaked at number 22 the following week. Similarly, in France, it debuted at 45 on the French Albums Chart. In Germany, Step Back in Time: The Definitive Collection entered the German Albums Chart at number 15. In Hungary, the album debuted at number 21 on the Hungarian Albums Chart. In Italy, the album entered the Italian Albums Chart at number 32. In New Zealand, it entered the New Zealand Albums Chart at number 27. In Poland, it debuted at number 41 on the Polish Albums Chart. In Spain, Step Back in Time: The Definitive Collection entered the Spanish Albums Chart at number five. In Switzerland, the album debuted at number 11 on the Swiss Albums Chart.

In the United States, it debuted at number six on the Top Independent Albums chart and number 32 on the Top Albums Sales chart.

Track listing
Track listing and credits adapted from album liner notes.

Vinyl editions

Notes
 On the deluxe edition, "Breathe" is included on disc one between "2 Hearts" and "Red Blooded Woman", whereas "New York City" serves as the final song on disc two in the form of a hidden track. Cassette and digital versions of the original release also follow this track order, however, the cassettes exclude "New York City".
 Besides a promo sticker on the packaging, the deluxe edition makes no mention of the song "New York City" being included in the track listing, nor is it credited in the liner notes.

Charts

Weekly charts

Year-end charts

Certifications

Release history

See also
 List of number-one albums of 2019 (Australia)
 List of UK Albums Chart number ones of 2019

References

2019 compilation albums
2019 greatest hits albums
Kylie Minogue compilation albums
Albums produced by Dan Carey (record producer)
Albums produced by Guy Chambers
Albums produced by Tony Cohen
Albums produced by Cutfather
Albums produced by Jim Eliot
Albums produced by Calvin Harris
Albums produced by Jimmy Harry
Albums produced by Greg Kurstin
Albums produced by Stuart Price
Albums produced by Stock Aitken Waterman
Albums produced by Victor Van Vugt
Albums produced by Richard Stannard (songwriter)